Kokoda is a Papuan language of the Bird's Head Peninsula of Kokoda District, South Sorong Regency, West Papua. The three dialects—Kokoda proper, Kasuweri, and Tarof—are divergent enough to sometimes be considered separate languages.

References

External links 
 

Nuclear South Bird's Head languages